Matthew Alexander (born 7 May 2002) is an English professional footballer who last played as a goalkeeper for  club Bolton Wanderers.

Career
On 10 August 2019, Alexander made his Bolton Wanderers debut in a 0–0 draw at home to Coventry City, in which Bolton fielded their youngest ever team, due to financial difficulties. He signed his first professional contract with Bolton Wanderers on 15 May 2020, penning a one-year deal. A year later, Bolton revealed he was contracted for the 2021–2022 season.

On 19 July 2021 it was announced that he would join Lancaster City on a season long loan, though the loan wouldn't officially start until a later date to allow him to take part in both Lancaster and Bolton's pre-seasons. The loan became "official" on 7 August and he made his competitive debut on 14 August in a 1–0 defeat against Whitby Town. Alexander was named Man of the Match despite Lancaster losing. Alexander started the season as first choice Goalkeeper, however he lost his place to fellow loanee Aidan Dowling and his loan was terminated early on 23 November. On 4 February 2022, he joined Runcorn Linnets on loan until the end of the season. He made his debut a day later in a 2–0 defeat against Trafford but picked up an injury during the match, causing him to miss the rest of the season. On 3 May 2022 the club confirmed that he would be released at the end of his contract.

Career statistics

References

2002 births
Living people
English footballers
Footballers from Newcastle upon Tyne
Association football goalkeepers
Newcastle United F.C. players
Bolton Wanderers F.C. players
Lancaster City F.C. players
Runcorn Linnets F.C. players
English Football League players
Northern Premier League players